Panu Oula Jääskeläinen (born 8 March 1969) is a Finnish former competitive figure skater. He is the 1992 Piruetten silver medalist, a two-time Nordic bronze medalist, and a five-time Finnish national champion. He represented Finland at the 1992 Winter Olympics.

Personal life 
Jääskeläinen was born on 8 March 1969 in Espoo, Finland. His sister, Anu Oksanen (née Jääskeläinen), is the head coach for the synchronized skating team Marigold IceUnity, who are multiple world champions.

Career 
Jääskeläinen was sent to ten European Championships from 1985 to 1994, achieving his best result, eighth, at the 1993 event in Helsinki. He also competed at nine World Championships and reached his highest placement, 12th, at the 1991 event in Munich. Jääskeläinen was selected to represent Finland at the 1992 Winter Olympics in Albertville and finished 19th. During his career, he trained at the Mariposa School of Skating in Barrie, Ontario, Canada.

Jääskeläinen retired from competition in 1994 and then joined an ice show in Blackpool, England. He also appeared on Strictly Ice Dancing, partnering with celebrity Carol Smillie.

He began coaching in Cape Town, South Africa, in around 2006 or 2007.

Results

References

External links

Navigation

Finnish male single skaters
Olympic figure skaters of Finland
Figure skaters at the 1992 Winter Olympics
Living people
1969 births
Sportspeople from Espoo
Finnish expatriates in South Africa